Md. Tafazzul Islam (born 8 February 1943) is a Bangladeshi who served as the 17th Chief Justice of Bangladesh.

Early life and education
Islam was born to Majeda Khatun and Momtazuddin Ahmed, a retired Superintendent of Police. His wife, Humaira Islam, is the founder executive director of Shakti Foundation, an NGO dedicated to empowering disadvantaged women.  Islam graduated with a Bachelor of Arts (Honours) in history from the University of Dhaka, continuing to complete his master's in the same subject and then his LLB. Later he completed his Bar vocational course in 1967. Islam stood first in Bangla recitation in the literary competition of Salimullah Muslim Hall in years 1959 and 1960. While doing the BVC in London, he was a news broadcaster in BBC.

Career
Islam was called to the Bar of England and Wales from the Honourable Society of Lincoln's Inn in 1967. He enrolled as an advocate of the High Court of East Pakistan in 1969. Later, in 1980, he became an advocate in the Appellate Division of the Supreme Court of Bangladesh.

He was elevated to the bench in 1994, as a judge of the High Court Division, and then to the Appellate Division of the Supreme Court of Bangladesh in 2003. In 2009, he was appointed as the Chief Justice of Bangladesh.

During the period he was an advocate, Islam had been actively associated with the teaching profession. He was an adjunct faculty in the City Law College, teaching The Transfer of Property Act, 1882 and Equity and Trust. He also taught Corporate law at the Institute of Business Administration, University of Dhaka, and was an Examiner in Law in Dhaka University. As a member of the Corporate Law Commission of Bangladesh, he actively participated in the drafting of Bank Company Act, 1991 and The Companies Act (Bangladesh), 1994.

While a judge of the High Court Division, he also held the offices of Chairman of the Enrollment Committee of the Bangladesh Bar Council, from 2004 to 2008, and of the chairman of the Bangladesh Judicial Service Commission during 2008–9.

Judgments
Islam was the principal author of several landmark judgments, laying the foundations for the development of laws and setting significant precedents. These include the judgments on repeal of the Fifth Amendment of the Constitution of Bangladesh, upholding the judgment of the High Court Division sentencing the killers of Sheikh Mujibur Rahman , enlarging the powers of the High Court Division under The Companies Act (Bangladesh), 1994 in protecting the interests of minority shareholders, and reversing the decision of the High Court Division to allow the construction of markets in violation of the provisions of environmental laws.

References

External links
 Tafazzul Islam

Living people
1943 births
Supreme Court of Bangladesh justices
University of Dhaka alumni
Chief justices of Bangladesh
Honorary Fellows of Bangla Academy
People from Comilla District